The Anglican Diocese of Akoko is one of twelve within the Anglican Province of Ondo, itself one of 14 provinces within the Church of Nigeria: the current bishop is Jacob Bada.

Bishops

Notes

Dioceses of the Province of Ondo
 
Akoko